Jaroslav Pospíšil is the defending champion.
Evgeny Donskoy won the title after defeating Adrian Ungur 6–1, 6–3 in the final.

Seeds

Draw

Finals

Top half

Bottom half

References
 Main draw
 Qualifying draw

2012 Singles
Meknes Singles